The 2012–13 Swedish Figure Skating Championships were held at the Vida Arena in Växjö between December 13 and 16, 2012. Skaters competed in the disciplines of men's singles, ladies' singles, and pair skating on the senior, junior, and novice levels. The results were among the criteria used to choose the teams to the 2013 World Championships and 2013 European Championships.

Senior results

Men

Ladies

Pairs

External links
 Results

Swedish Figure Skating Championships 2012-2013
Swedish Figure Skating Championships 2012-2013
Swedish Figure Skating Championships
Figure Skating Championships 2012-2013
Figure Skating Championships 2012-2013
Sports competitions in Växjö